Lord Colum Edmund Crichton-Stuart (KM, MP) was born on 3 April 1886 and died 18 August 1957, aged 71. Lord Colum Edmund Crichton-Stuart, who was baptised as Columba, was the fourth child of John Patrick Crichton-Stuart, 3rd Marquess of the County of Bute (d. 1900) and the Hon. Gwendolen Mary Anne Fitzalan-Howard (d. 1932). He married Elizabeth Caroline Petty-Fitzmaurice, Marchioness of Lansdowne (widow of Henry William Edmund [Petty-Fitzmaurice] 6th Marquess of Lansdowne; d. 25 Mar 1964) and the only daughter of Sir Edward Stanley Hope KCB and Constance C. Leslie. Lord Colum was educated at Harrow and Christ Church, Oxford University, England.

Lord Colum entered into the diplomatic service nominated an Attaché, June 11, 1910. Passed a competitive examination February 18, 1911. Appointed to Cairo, October 28, 1911, he was later appointed an attacheship at the British Consulate-General in Cairo working under Lord Kitchener. He was a Gold Staff Officer at the Coronation of King George V, 1911 receiving the Coronation Medal. Granted an allowance for knowledge of Arabic June 26, (he was a master of seven languages), 1912.Promoted to be a 3rd Secretary, May 10, 1913. Transferred to the Foreign Office, November 11, 1914, and to Christiania (Denmark), May 11, 1916. Again transferred to the Foreign Office, September 30, 1916. Promoted to be a 2nd Secretary, April 1, 1919. Resigned, May 1, 1919.

Lord Colum stood for election in Cardiff East in December 1918, a seat once held by his brother Lord Ninian, losing to William Seager. Lord Colum's position in the civil service ended in 1920 he later served as Member of Parliament for the Northwich constituency in Cheshire from 1922 to 1945. In 1945, Lord Colum bestowed Pluscarden Priory in Moray, Scotland over to the Benedictine community at Prinknash Abbey in Gloucestershire, for use as a daughter house. He held the office of Lord-Lieutenant of Bute between 1953 and 1957.

He collapsed and died in 1957 while attending a service of Mass at St. Andrew's Roman Catholic Church at Rothesay.

References

External links 
 

1886 births
1957 deaths
Lord-Lieutenants of Buteshire
Conservative Party (UK) MPs for English constituencies
Younger sons of marquesses
UK MPs 1922–1923
UK MPs 1923–1924
UK MPs 1924–1929
UK MPs 1929–1931
UK MPs 1931–1935
UK MPs 1935–1945
Colum Stuart